Hǫfuð ("man-head," Norwegian hoved, Danish hoved, Swedish huvud and Icelandic höfuð) is the sword of Heimdallr. It's mentioned in Gylfaginning chapter 26.

The Skáldskaparmál also mentions a mysterious myth about Heimdall's head and sword in its eighth chapter.

Notes

References
Simek, Rudolf (2007) translated by Angela Hall. Dictionary of Northern Mythology. D.S. Brewer. .
Faulkes, Anthony (1982), edition of: Snorri Sturluson. Edda. Prologue and Gylfaginning. London: Viking Society for Northern Research. .

Mythological Norse weapons
Mythological swords